Clantonville is an unincorporated community in Benton County, Arkansas, United States.

References

Unincorporated communities in Benton County, Arkansas
Unincorporated communities in Arkansas